The 2020–21 FIU Panthers women's basketball team represented Florida International University during the 2020–21 NCAA Division I women's basketball season. The team was led by first-year head coach Robyn Scherr-Wells, and played their home games at the Ocean Bank Convocation Center in Miami, FL as a member of Conference USA.

Schedule and results

|-
!colspan=12 style=|Regular season

|-
!colspan=12 style=| CUSA Tournament

|-
!colspan=12 style=| WBI

See also
 2020–21 FIU Panthers men's basketball team

Notes

References

FIU Panthers women's basketball seasons
FIU Panthers
FIU Panthers women's basketball team
FIU Panthers women's basketball team